Mahari is a Hebrew acronym, referring to any one of a number of rabbis:

Yaakov ben Moshe Levi Moelin (1365–1427), known as Maharil, Mahari Segal or Mahari Moelin
Yehuda Leib Schneersohn (1811–1866), Ukrainian Hasidic rabbi, first leader of the Kapust Hasidim
Israel Isserlin (1390–1460), known as Mahari Isserlin
Jacob Weil (fl. 15th century), known as Mahari Weil or Mahariv
Judah ben Eliezer ha-Levi Minz (1405–1508), known as Mahari Mintz
Isaac da Fonseca Aboab (1605–1693), known as Mahari Abuhav

Mahari may also refer to:

Abu Bakar Mahari (born 1985), Bruneian footballer
Gurgen Mahari (1903–1969), Armenian writer, born Gurgen Ajemian
Mahari dance, a dance form in Odisha, India
Desbele Mehari, eritrean writer

See also
 Mahara (disambiguation)